Baebang Station is a railway station on Seoul Metropolitan Subway Line 1 and the Janghang Line in Asan, South Korea.

References

External links
 Station information from Korail

Seoul Metropolitan Subway stations
Metro stations in Asan
Railway stations opened in 1922